Koz or KOZ may refer to:

People
Cüneyt Köz, Turkish footballer
Dave Koz, American jazz saxophonist, keyboardist, and composer
Rich Koz, American actor and broadcaster
Koz (musician), Canadian musician

Other
A kilo-ounce
KOZ SR, Confederation of Trade Unions of the Slovak Republic (Konfederácia odborových zväzov Slovenskej republiky)
KOZ, Keystone Opportunity Zone, areas in Pennsylvania with reduced tax
Kosciuszko Park in Chicago, IL, Land of Koz

Turkish-language surnames